In probability theory, a Cox process, also known as a doubly stochastic Poisson process is a point process which is a generalization of a Poisson process where the intensity that varies across the underlying mathematical space (often space or time) is itself a stochastic process. The process is named after the statistician David Cox, who first published the model in 1955.

Cox processes are used to generate simulations of spike trains (the sequence of action potentials generated by a neuron), and also in financial mathematics where they produce a "useful framework for modeling prices of financial instruments in which credit risk is a significant factor."

Definition 
Let  be a random measure.

Laplace transform 

for any positive, measurable function .

See also
 Poisson hidden Markov model
 Doubly stochastic model
 Inhomogeneous Poisson process, where λ(t) is restricted to a deterministic function
 Ross's conjecture
 Gaussian process
 Mixed Poisson process

References
Notes

Bibliography
 Cox, D. R. and Isham, V. Point Processes, London: Chapman & Hall, 1980 
 Donald L. Snyder and Michael I. Miller Random Point Processes in Time and Space Springer-Verlag, 1991  (New York)  (Berlin)

Poisson point processes